The 1969 UTEP Miners football team was an American football team that represented the University of Texas at El Paso as a member of the Western Athletic Conference (WAC) during the 1969 NCAA University Division football season. In its fifth season under head coach Bobby Dobbs, the team compiled a 4–6 record (2–5 against WAC opponents), finished sixth in the conference, and was outscored by a total of 242 to 158.

Schedule

References

UTEP
UTEP Miners football seasons
UTEP Miners football